Steven's swellshark (Cephaloscyllium stevensi)  is a species of swellshark which resides in the waters around Papua New Guinea. It was described by Clark and Randall in 2011.

References

Steven's swellshark
Fish of Papua New Guinea
Steven's swellshark
Taxa named by Eugenie Clark